The TCR Australia Touring Car Series is a touring car racing series based in Australia. The series is run as part of the Shannons Nationals series.

Background

The TCR Touring Car formula, introduced in 2014, is based on four or five door front-wheel drive production vehicles powered by 2.0 litre turbocharged engines. Since then, several global and regional TCR championships have been established and TCR regulations have been adopted in several series, including the World Touring Car Cup from 2018 onwards. The performance of different models of car is managed and adjusted through a Balance of Performance system to attempt to maintain parity.

Plans for an Australian TCR championship were floated as early as 2016, with a proposal for invitational entries in the Bathurst 12 Hour as well as a six-round championship commencing in 2017, to have been shared between Shannons Nationals and Supercars Championship, the premier touring car category in Australia, events. A later proposal in 2017 included TCR cars running in a support class to the Australian GT Championship's GT Trophy series before launching a standalone series in 2018. While neither plan eventuated, in January 2018 the Confederation of Australian Motor Sport announced they had secured the rights to develop a TCR series in Australia starting from 2019, with the Australian Racing Group later announced as the promoter of the series.

History
The inaugural season of TCR Australia in 2019 featured a seven-round calendar run at Shannons Nationals events. The championship begun with 17 entries with eight manufacturers, Alfa Romeo, Audi, Holden, Honda, Hyundai, Renault, Subaru and Volkswagen represented. Supercars Championship teams Garry Rogers Motorsport, Kelly Racing and Matt Stone Racing were among the teams to prepare cars while former Bathurst 1000 winner Jason Bright became the championship's first race winner at Sydney Motorsport Park in a Volkswagen Golf GTI TCR. Will Brown, in a Hyundai i30 N TCR, won the two Sunday races at the first event and soon became a dominant force in the championship, winning four further races to wrap up the championship title at Sandown Raceway with one round to spare. The series featured a wide range of guest drivers who entered selected rounds of the championship, including World Touring Car Cup regulars Jean-Karl Vernay and Néstor Girolami, who each won races in their only appearance, and former Supercars champions Garth Tander and Russell Ingall.

In 2020, TCR Australia planned to incorporate a round at Mount Panorama Circuit as part of the Bathurst 6 Hour Easter weekend, with the circuit to also host an international TCR endurance race later in the year. An additional non-championship event, known as the TCR Asia Pacific Cup, will appear at the Australian Grand Prix, which eventuated after a bid for TCR Australia to be a support event to the Adelaide 500 was rejected.

Champions

Media coverage
For the inaugural season in 2019, all TCR Australia races were shown live in Australia on free-to-air network SBS, as well as being streamed online.
For 2020, the Seven Network has entered an agreement to broadcast races live in Australia including the S5000 series.

References

External links
 Official website

TCR Series
Auto racing series in Australia
2019 establishments in Australia
Touring car racing